For Men Only is a 1952 American film noir directed by Paul Henreid about hazing on college campuses. Henreid also starred in the film alongside Margaret Field and Kathleen Hughes. The film was distributed by the independent Lippert Pictures. It was the film debut of Russell Johnson. It was also known by the alternative title of The Tall Lie.

Plot
Tough college student Tod Palmer (Robert Sherman) patiently suffers increasingly severe hazing at the hands of sadistic Ky Walker (Russell Johnson) while pledging a fraternity at Wake College. Attempting to bring the ritual initiation abuses to the authorities' attention, Tod accidentally dies after fleeing from the angry fraternity brothers. Medical professor Dr. Stephen Brice (Paul Henreid) then tries to end the practice of hazing, determined to obtain justice for one of his best students.

Production
Henreid had directed in theatre but this was his first film. He had produced two films before, Hollow Triumph and So Young, So Bad.

Paul Henreid set up the project with Edward Nassour. They established HN Productions -
for Henreid and Nassour. In March 1951 they arranged finance through Robert L. Lippert. Henreid and Lippert were secretive about the subject matter, describing it as "topical and controversial." Henreid admitted he later kept the topic secret so no other produces would beat them to the screens with a similar story.

Filming started 5 September 1951 at the General Service Studio. There had been a week's rehearsal beforehand. Filming took 16 days, and was completed two days ahead of schedule.

Henreid said getting the script and finance and making the film took him a year. He says he originally wanted to call the film Hell Night but the distributors came up with For Men Only.

Henreid wanted to make The Spanish Grandee and Ring around Saturn for Nassour but these were never made.

Reception
Henreid later said the film was "very successful" and credited it with launching his directing career.

Cast
Paul Henreid as Dr. Stephen Brice
Margaret Field as Julie Brice
James Dobson (actor) as Bartholomew "Beanie" Brown
Kathleen Hughes as Tracy Norman
Douglas Kennedy as Colin Mayberry
Robert Carson as Jesse Hopkins
Virginia Mullen as Mrs. Palmer
O. Z. Whitehead as Professor Bixby
Vera Miles as Kathy
 Robert Sherman as Tod Palmer
Russell Johnson as Ky Walker
 Christian Drake as 	Jack
 John Eldredge as Mr. St. Claire - Regents Board Member 
 Vernon Rich	as	Mr. Blaine - Regents Board Member 
 Franklyn Farnum as Regents Board Member
 Norman Leavitt as 	Motorist

References

External links

Review of film at The New York Times

1952 films
American drama films
1952 drama films
Films directed by Paul Henreid
Lippert Pictures films
American black-and-white films
1950s English-language films
1950s American films